2011 Veteraniya, provisional designation , is a stony Vestian asteroid from the inner regions of the asteroid belt, approximately 6 kilometers in diameter. It was discovered on 30 August 1970, by Russian astronomer Tamara Smirnova at the Crimean Astrophysical Observatory, Nauchnyj, on the Crimean peninsula, and named for the Soviet veterans of the Second World War.

Classification and orbit 

Veteraniya is a member of the Vesta family. It orbits the Sun in the inner main-belt at a distance of 2.0–2.7 AU once every 3 years and 8 months (1,347 days). Its orbit has an eccentricity of 0.15 and an inclination of 6° with respect to the ecliptic. The first precovery was taken at Palomar Observatory in 1950, extending the asteroid's observation arc by 20 years prior to its discovery.

Physical characteristics 

The Collaborative Asteroid Lightcurve Link (CALL) and Pan-STARRS large-scale survey classify it as a S-type and V-type asteroid, respectively.

According to the survey carried out by the NEOWISE mission of NASA's space-based Wide-field Infrared Survey Explorer, the asteroid's surface has an exceptionally high albedo of 0.46 and a corresponding diameter of 5.2 kilometers, while CALL assumes a standard albedo for stony asteroids of 0.20. CALL therefore calculates a larger diameter of 7.8 kilometers, as the lower the albedo (reflectivity), the higher the body's diameter at a constant absolute magnitude (brightness).

Naming 

This minor planet was named in honor of the Soviet veterans of the Great Patriotic War. (The term is used in Russia to describe the conflict fought between the Soviet Union and Nazi Germany on the Eastern Front of World War II during 1941–1945.) The official  was published by the Minor Planet Center on 1 September 1978.

Notes

References

External links 
 Asteroid Lightcurve Database (LCDB), query form (info )
 Dictionary of Minor Planet Names, Google books
 Asteroids and comets rotation curves, CdR – Observatoire de Genève, Raoul Behrend
 Discovery Circumstances: Numbered Minor Planets (1)-(5000) – Minor Planet Center
 
 

002011
Veteraniya
Named minor planets
19700830